Swan Quarter (sometimes named Swanquarter) is an unincorporated community and census-designated place (CDP) in Hyde County, North Carolina, United States. It is the Hyde county seat. As of the 2010 census it had a population of 324.

Geography 
It is located on Swanquarter Bay, an inlet of Pamlico Sound.

U.S. Route 264 runs along the northern edge of the community, leading east  to Manteo and west  to Washington.

Climate

Demographics

2020 census

As of the 2020 United States census, there were 275 people, 164 households, and 153 families residing in the CDP.

2010 census
The population, at the time of the 2010 census, was 324.

History 
In the 18th century, Samuel Swann settled along Pamlico Sound near the head of Swan Bay. Swann's Quarter was the first name given to this settlement. Eventually shortened to Swan Quarter, it became the county seat in 1836.

The Hyde County Courthouse and Lake Mattamuskeet Pump Station, also known as Mattamuskeet Lodge, are listed on the National Register of Historic Places.

Transportation 
A 50-car ferry connects Swan Quarter in Hyde County on the mainland with Ocracoke Island, crossing Pamlico Sound in two and a half hours.

Wildlife and preservation 
It provides habitat for migratory waterfowl and other birds, for endangered species such as bald eagles, peregrine falcons, and American alligators. It also provides wildlife-related recreation and environmental education for the public on its  of land.

Education
The local school is Mattamuskeet School of Hyde County Schools.

In the de jure segregation era, the grade school for black students was, by the 1960s, O. A. Peay School, a consolidation of earlier such schools, near Swan Quarter. The high school for black students was Hyde County Training School in Sladesville. The high school for white students was West Hyde School.

Peay's and Hyde County Training School's students held school reunions, though these diminished by 2017.

References

External links 
 Mattamuskeet National Wildlife Refuge
 About Swan Quarter Landing
  Hyde County Genealogy

Unincorporated communities in Hyde County, North Carolina
County seats in North Carolina